Christelle Vuanga Mukongo (born 1987) is a DRC politician. She is a deputy in the National Assembly representing the Kinshasa 2 constituency in Kinshasa, on behalf of the Alliance of Movements of Kongo (AMK), a party within Moïse Katumbi's Lamuka Coalition.

Life
Christelle Vuanga Mukongo was born in 1987 in Kinshasa. She trained as a journalist before entering politics, and was President of the Human Rights Commission.

In the 2018 general election Vuanga was elected as the deputy for Kinshasa II. In 2021 she replaced Cathy Musengi as President of the Gender, Child and Family Committee.

References

1987 births
Living people
Democratic Republic of the Congo journalists
Members of the National Assembly (Democratic Republic of the Congo)
21st-century Democratic Republic of the Congo women politicians
21st-century Democratic Republic of the Congo politicians